First Lieutenant Richard H. Anderson, of White Plains, New York, was a U.S. Army Air Force pilot who became an ace in a day. Flying Republic P-47D Thunderbolts with the 19th Fighter Squadron, 318th Fighter Group, from Ie Shima Airfield, Okinawa, he downed five Japanese fighters in a single action on 25 May 1945.

Action
On 25 May 1945, Anderson, and his wingman, Second Lieutenant Donald E. Kennedy, of San Antonio, Texas, spotted 30 Mitsubishi A6M Zero fighters headed towards Okinawa at 2,000 feet, and both attacked despite odds of 15 to one.

"The first four were easy since I was on their tail," Anderson said. "I got the fifth on a deflection shot as he was turning away. When I was pressed the trigger with the sixth in my sights, I found I only had one bullet left and he got away."

"Kennedy sent three enemy planes crashing into the sea before other Thunderbolts closed in and drove off or shot down the remainder. Thunderbolts were credited with 34 planes that day," said an official announcement released on 3 June 1945.

References

American World War II flying aces
People from White Plains, New York
United States Army officers
United States Army Air Forces pilots of World War II
Possibly living people